Athymoris martialis is a moth in the family Lecithoceridae. It is found in Taiwan, Korea, southern China, and Japan.

References

Moths described in 1935
Athymoris
Moths of Asia
Moths of Japan
Moths of Korea
Moths of Taiwan